London is a historical novel by Edward Rutherfurd published in 1997, which charts the history of London from 54 B.C. to 1997. The novel begins with the birth of the River Thames and moves to 54 B.C., detailing the life of  Segovax, a curious character with slightly webbed hands and a flash of white hair. Segovax becomes the ancestor of the Ducket and Dogget families, prominent fictional families woven into the novel.

Historical figures, such as Julius Caesar, Geoffrey Chaucer, Henry VIII, William Shakespeare, and Pocahontas, make appearances alongside fictional characters and historical kings and queens of England.

Reception

"[W]ide range of characters that the readers will either love or hate... all manner of people with all kinds of backgrounds... Rutherfurd is adept at showing how all classes throughout history, from slaves to kings, have contributed to London's development".

Also the Virginia Pilot said of the novel:
"With confidence and skill, Rutherfurd has separated those layers and produced a remarkable story of a great city. Once or twice the social, political and economic factors overshadow the fictional families, but that is almost inevitable when even the best fiction comes up against such an impressive spectrum of historical fact.".

Publication details
1997, UK, Century, May 1997, hardback (First edition)
1997, USA, Crown Pub, June 1997, hardback 
1997, UK, Century, 1997, paperback
1998, USA, Fawcett Books, 30 April 1998, paperback
1998, UK, Arrow Books, 7 May 1998, paperback
2002, USA, Ballantine Books, 1 November 2002, paperback

Footnotes

References

External links
 The first chapter at New York Times Books

1997 British novels
Novels by Edward Rutherfurd
Historical novels
Novels set in London
History of London
Century (imprint) books